Peter Brötzmann (born 6 March 1941) is a German saxophonist and clarinetist.

Biography

Early life

Brötzmann was born in Remscheid, North Rhine-Westphalia, Germany. He studied painting in Wuppertal and was involved with the Fluxus movement but grew dissatisfied with art galleries and exhibitions. He experienced his first jazz concert when he saw American jazz musician Sidney Bechet while still in school at Wuppertal, and it made a lasting impression.

He has not abandoned his art training. Brötzmann has designed most of his album covers. He taught himself to play clarinets, then saxophones; he is also known for playing the tárogató. Among his first musical partnerships was with double bassist Peter Kowald. For Adolphe Sax, Brötzmann's first recording, was released in 1967 and featured Kowald and drummer Sven-Åke Johansson. In 1968 Machine Gun, an octet recording, was released. The album was self-produced under his BRO record label imprint and sold at concerts, but it was later marketed by FMP. In 2007 Atavistic reissued Machine Gun.

Career
The album Nipples was recorded in 1969 with many of the Machine Gun musicians, including drummer Han Bennink, pianist Fred Van Hove, and tenor saxophonist Evan Parker, plus British guitarist Derek Bailey. The second set of takes from these sessions, called More Nipples, is more raucous. Fuck de Boere (Dedicated to Johnny Dyani) is a live album of free sessions from these early years, containing two long improvisations, a 1968 recording of "Machine Gun" live (earlier than the studio version) and a longer jam from 1970. Brötzmann was a member of Bennink's Instant Composers Pool, a collective of musicians who released their own records and that grew into a 10-piece orchestra.

The logistics of touring with the ICP tentet or his octet resulted in Brötzmann reducing the group to a trio with Han Bennink and Fred Van Hove. Bennink was a partner in Schwarzwaldfahrt, an album of duets recorded outside in the Black Forest in 1977 with Bennink drumming on trees and other objects found in the woods.

In 1981, Brötzmann made a radio broadcast with Frank Wright and Willem Breuker (saxes), Toshinori Kondo (trumpet), Hannes Bauer and Alan Tomlinson (trombones), Alexander von Schlippenbach (piano), Louis Moholo (drums), Harry Miller (bass). This was released as the album Alarm.

In the 1980s, Brötzmann flirted with heavy metal and noise rock, recording with Last Exit and the band's bass guitarist and producer Bill Laswell.

Brötzmann has released over fifty albums as a bandleader and has appeared on dozens more. His "Die Like a Dog Quartet" (with Toshinori Kondo, William Parker and drummer Hamid Drake) is loosely inspired by saxophonist Albert Ayler, a prime influence on Brötzmann's music. Since 1997, he has toured and recorded regularly with the Peter Brötzmann Chicago Tentet (initially an octet) which he disbanded after an ensemble performance in November 2012 in Strasbourg, France.

Brötzmann has also recorded or performed with Cecil Taylor, Keiji Haino, Willem van Manen, Mats Gustafsson, Ken Vandermark, Conny Bauer, Joe McPhee, Paal Nilssen-Love and Brötzmann's son, Caspar Brötzmann.

Discography

As leader
 For Adolphe Sax (Brö, 1967)
 Machine Gun (Brö, 1968)
 Nipples (Calig, 1969)
 Solo (FMP, 1976)
 3 Points and a Mountain with Misha Mengelberg (FMP, 1979)
 Alarm (FMP, 1983)
 Pica Pica (FMP, 1984)
 Berlin Djungle (FMP, 1987)
 Go-No-Go (FMP, 1987)
 Low Life (Celluloid, 1987)
 In a State of Undress with Jay Oliver  (FMP, 1989)
 Reserve with Günter Sommer (FMP, 1989)
 No Nothing (FMP, 1991)
 The Marz Combo Live in Wuppertal (FMP, 1993)
 Songlines with Fred Hopkins and Rashied Ali (FMP, 1994)
 Sacred Scrape with Gregg Bendian  (Rastascan, 1994)
 Nothing to Say (FMP, 1996)
 Exhilaration with Borah Bergman (Soul Note, 1997)
 Eight by Three with Borah Bergman (Mixtery, 1997)
 1/2/3 (Okka Disk, 1998)
 Stone & Water (Okka Disk, 2000)
 The Atlanta Concert with Fred Hopkins (Okka Disk, 2001)
 Right as Rain (FMP, 2001)
 Fuck de Boere (Atavistic, 2001)
 Organized Chaos with Nicky Skopelitis (Konnex, 2002)
 Short Visit to Nowhere (Okka Disk, 2002)
 Usable Past (Olof Bright, 2002)
 Broken English (Okka Disk, 2002)
 The Ink Is Gone with Walter Perkins (Brö, 2003)
 The Inexplicable Flyswatter (Atavistic, 2003)
 More Nipples (Atavistic, 2003)
 Petroglyphs (Long Arms, 2004)
 Live at Spruce Street Forum with Lisle Ellis (Botticelli 2004)
 Tales Out of Time (HatHut, 2004)
 Signs (Okka Disk, 2004)
 Images (Okka Disk, 2004)
 Be Music Night (Okka Disk, 2005)
 Live at the 'Bottle' Fest 2005 (Brö, 2005)
 American Landscapes 1 (Okka Disk, 2007)
 American Landscapes 2 (Okka Disk, 2007)
 The Fat Is Gone with Paal Nilssen-Love (Smalltown Superjazzz, 2007)
 SweetSweat with Paal Nilssen-Love (Smalltown Superjazzz, 2008)
 At Molde 2007 (Okka Disk, 2008)
 Hairy Bones with Toshinori Kondo (Okka Disk, 2009)
 Lost & Found (FMP, 2009)
 Goosetalks with Johannes Bauer (Kilogram, 2010)
 Mayday (Corbett vs. Dempsey, 2010)
 Woodcuts (Smalltown Superjazzz, 2010)
 Live in Wiesbaden with Jörg Fischer (Not Two, 2011)
 Yatagarasu with Masahiko Satoh (Not Two, 2012)
 Going All Fancy with Jason Adasiewicz (Brö, 2012)
 Walk, Love, Sleep (Smalltown Superjazzz, 2012)
 The Worse the Better (Otoroku, 2012)
 Solo at Dobialab (Dobialabel 2012)
 Solo & Trio Roma (Victo, 2012)
 China Live 2011 (Jazzhus 2012)
 Solid and Spirit (Nero's Neptune 2013)
 Peter Brotzmann Alexander Von Schlippenbach Achim Trampenau (Carbon Edition, 2013)
 Mollie's in the Mood with Jason Adasiewicz (Brö, 2014)
 Whatthefuckdoyouwant with Sonny Sharrock (Trost, 2014)
 Mental Shake (Otoroku, 2014)
 Munster Bern (Cubus, 2015)
 Beautiful Lies (Neos, 2016)
 Machine Gun Alternate Takes (Cien Fuegos, 2018)
 I Surrender Dear (Trost, 2019)
 Karacho! (Euphorium, 2019)
 No Nothing Alternate Takes (FMP, 2020)
 Philosophy of Sound (Toshinori Kondo 2020)

With Han Bennink
 Ein Halber Hund Kann Nicht Pinkeln (FMP, 1977)
 Schwarzwaldfahrt (FMP, 1977)
 Atsugi Concert (Gua Bungue 1980)
 Still Quite Popular After All Those Years (Brö, 2004)
 Total Music Meeting 1977 Berlin (Brö, 2006)
 In Amherst 2006 (Brö, 2008)

With Die Like a Dog Quartet
 Die Like a Dog: Fragments of Music, Life and Death of Albert Ayler (FMP, 1994)
 Little Birds Have Fast Hearts Nos. 1 and 2 (FMP, 1998/1999)
 From Valley to Valley (Eremite, 1999)
 Aoyama Crows (FMP, 2002)
 Close Up (FMP, 2011)

With Hamid Drake
 The Dried Rat–Dog (Okka Disk, 1995)
 Live at the Empty Bottle (Okka Disk, 1999)
 Brotzmann & Drake (Brö, 2010)

With Mahmoud Guinia and Hamid Drake
 The Wels Concert (Okka Disk, 1997)

With Moukhtar Gania and Hamid Drake
 The Catch of a Ghost (I Dischi Di Angelica, 2020)

With Milford Graves and William Parker
 Historic Music Past Tense Future (Black Editions Archive, 2022)

With Fred Lonberg-Holm
 The Brain of the Dog in Section (Atavistic, 2008)
 Ouroboros (Astral Spirits, 2018)
 Memories of a Tunicate (Relative Pitch, 2020)

With Last Exit
 Last Exit (Enemy, 1986)
 The Noise of Trouble  (Enemy, 1986)
 Cassette Recordings '87 (Enemy, 1987)
 Iron Path (Virgin, 1988)
 Köln (ITM, 1990)
 Headfirst into the Flames (MuWorks, 1993)

With Harry Miller
 The Nearer the Bone, the Sweeter the Meat (FMP, 1979)
 Opened, But Hardly Touched (FMP, 1981)
 Brotzmann & Miller (Corbett Vs. Dempsey 2007)

With William Parker
 Nothung In (Tone Music 2002)
 Never Too Late But Always Too Early (Eremite, 2003)
 Song Sentimentale (Otoroku, 2016)

With Steve Swell
 Krakow Nights (Not Two, 2015)
 Live in Copenhagen (Not Two, 2016)
 Live in Tel Aviv (Not Two, 2017)

With Fred Van Hove
 Balls (FMP, 1970)
 The End (FMP, 1971)
 Elements (FMP, 1971)
 Brotzmann/Van Hove/Bennink (FMP, 1973)
 Free Jazz Und Kinder (FMP, 1973)
 Tschus (FMP, 1975)
 Outspan No 1 (FMP, 1975)
 Outspan No 2 (FMP, 1975)
 1971 (Corbett vs. Dempsey, 2015)
 Couscouss De La Mauresque (FMP, 2017)

With Wild Man's Band
 The Wild Mans Band (Ninth World Music, 1998)
 Three Rocks and a Pine (Ninth World Music, 1999)
 The Darkest River (Ninth World Music, 2001)
 Flower Head (Ninth World Music, 2007)
 Fredensborg (Ninth World Music, 2015)
 Live Kobenhavn 2009 (Ninth World Music, 2015)
With Sakari Luoma & Nikolai Yudanov

 Fryed Fruit (Red Toucan Records, 2001)

As sideman
With Frode Gjerstad
 Invisible Touch (Cadence, 1999)
 Sharp Knives Cut Deeper (Splasc(H), 2003)
 Soria Moria (FMR, 2003)
 Live at the Empty Bottle (Circulasione Totale 2019)

With Globe Unity Orchestra
 Live in Wuppertal (FMP, 1973)
 Der Alte Mann Bricht ... Sein Schweigen (FMP, 1974)
 Bavarian Calypso & Good Bye (FMP, 1975)
 Jahrmarkt/Local Fair (Po Torch, 1977)
 Pearls (FMP, 1977)
 Improvisations (Japo, 1978)
 Hamburg '74 (FMP, 1979)
 Globe Unity 2002 (Intakt, 2003)
 Baden-Baden '75 (FMP, 2011)

With others
 Derek Bailey, Live in Okayama 1987 (Improvised, 2000)
 Ginger Baker, No Material (ITM, 1989)
 Ginger Baker, Live in Munich Germany 1987 (Voiceprint, 2010)
 Johannes Bauer, Blue City (Trost, 2017)
 Thomas Borgmann, Stalker Songs (CIMP, 1998)
 Caspar Brotzmann, Last Home (Pathological, 1990)
 Don Cherry, Actions (Philips, 1971)
 Marilyn Crispell, Hyperion  (Music & Art, 1995)
 Andrew Cyrille, Andrew Cyrille Meets Brötzmann in Berlin (FMP, 1983)
 Hanns Eisler, Einheitsfrontlied (FMP, 1973)
 Heiner Goebbels, Horstucke (ECM, 1994)
 Charles Hayward, Double Agent(s) Live in Japan Vol. Two (Locus Solus, 1998)
 Haino Keiji, Two City Blues (Trost, 2015)
 Peter Kowald, Duos Europa (FMP, 1991)
 London Jazz Composers Orchestra, Stringer (FMP, 1983)
 London Jazz Composers Orchestra, That Time (Not Two, 2020)
 Joe McPhee, Guts (Okka Disk, 2006)
 Joe McPhee, The Damage Is Done (Not Two, 2009)
 Misha Mengelberg, Groupcomposing (Instant Composers Pool, 1978)
 Misha Mengelberg, Japan Japon (Instant Composers Pool, 1982)
 Phil Minton, The Berlin Station (FMP, 1988)
 Evan Parker, The Bishop's Move (Victo, 2004)
 Manfred Schoof, European Echoes (FMP, 1969)
 Cecil Taylor, Alms/Tiergarten (Spree) (FMP, 1989)
 Cecil Taylor, Olu Iwa (Soul Note, 1994)
 Fred Van Hove, Front to Front (Dropa Disc 2020)
 Alexander von Schlippenbach, Globe Unity (SABA, 1967)
 Alexander von Schlippenbach, The Living Music (Quasar, 1969)

Films
 RAGE!, by Bernard Josse (F 2011)
 BRÖTZMANN, Filmproduktion Siegersbusch, documentary film by René Jeuckens, Thomas Mau and Grischa Windus (Cinema, DVD, D/UK 2011)

Further reading
Peter Brötzmann, We thought we could change the world. Conversations with Gérard Rouy. Wolke Verlag, Hofheim 2014. .

References

External links

Official website
Interviews, discographies and photographs
Projects, releases and photographs
 
 

1941 births
Living people
Avant-garde jazz musicians
German jazz saxophonists
Male saxophonists
Last Exit (free jazz band) members
People from Remscheid
People from the Rhine Province
CIMP artists
21st-century saxophonists
21st-century German male musicians
German male jazz musicians
Globe Unity Orchestra members
ICP Orchestra members
Atavistic Records artists
FMP/Free Music Production artists
Okka Disk artists